BritBox is an online digital video subscription service, founded by BBC Studios and ITV, operating in nine countries across North America, Europe, Australia and South Africa. It is focused on British television series and films, mainly featuring current and past series and films supplied from two British terrestrial broadcasters of the BBC and ITV (Channel 4 and Channel 5 programming are available on the UK service), in addition to original programming. BritBox is said to feature the biggest collection of British box sets available in one place, with additional original programming available from 2020.

BritBox was first launched in the United States on 7 March 2017, followed by a launch in Canada on 14 February 2018.  A separately managed UK service was launched on 7 November 2019. From 2020, the service has since launched in Australia, South Africa, and in the Nordic countries of Sweden, Finland, Denmark and Norway, through local partnerships in these four countries. The service in the UK and the international services are operated differently, and host differing content, including BritBox UK's exclusive original content. There are content restrictions between each platform, leading some content to be available on one platform and unavailable on another.

BritBox provides new episodes to British soaps and dramas such as EastEnders, Coronation Street and Emmerdale, within hours of their UK broadcast via BritBox's 'Now' feature to US and Canadian users, but also includes extensive archives of older programming, such as the popular Doctor Who classic series on the service. It reported a subscriber base of 250,000 within a year since launching in the US. In 2019, 650,000 subscribers were reported from the North American platform. In early 2020, the number of US and Canadian subscribers surpassed 1 million users, to around 1.2 million by August, and 1.5 million by October, following strong growth in the North American service due to the COVID-19 pandemic. On 9 March 2021, it was reported that the UK service had surpassed 500,000 subscribers, meeting BritBox's UK target. Will Harrison, BritBox UK's managing director told members of the UK Broadcasting Press Guild that BritBox was "very happy" at how the service had performed since its November 2019 launch. By 1 July 2022, it had reached 2.6 million.

History

Failed "Project Kangaroo" 

Though not officially described as its successor, BritBox has been likened to an earlier attempt by UK public service broadcasters (PSBs) (BBC Worldwide, ITV and Channel 4) to create an online video-on-demand download service, codenamed "Project Kangaroo", in November 2007. This followed the launches of the broadcasters' own video-on-demand services.

On Wednesday, 4 February 2009, Project Kangaroo was blocked by the Competition Commission.

The commission stated that the case surrounding Kangaroo was about the control of valuable UK-originated TV content. "BBC Worldwide, ITV and Channel 4 together control the vast majority of this material, which puts them in a very strong position as wholesalers of TV content to restrict competition from other current and future providers of video-on-demand services to UK viewers," said Peter Freeman, the chairman of the Competition Commission, in its final report on Project Kangaroo. "We thought viewers would benefit from better video-on-demand [VoD] services if the parties – possibly in conjunction with other new and/or already established providers of VoD – competed with each other."

A Channel 4 spokesperson said at the time, "This is a disproportionate remedy and a missed opportunity in the further development of British broadcasting."

After the planned Project Kangaroo was blocked, the system's assets were sold to transmitter firm Arqiva and this led to the development of the service SeeSaw, which operated from February 2010 to October 2011, with content from the BBC, ITV, Channel 4, and Channel 5, some of which (such as Doctor Who) now appears on BritBox.

Rise of streaming 
Since the rise of Netflix and subsequent other Subscription Video on Demand services (SVODs), European PSBs and media companies, in particular, have started to find ways to compete with the increasing dominance of American SVODs, and many old rivalries have been put aside in preference of  collaboration by creating jointly-controlled SVODs, such as BritBox, Salto (backed by French networks TF1 Group, France Télévisions and M6), and Germany-based Joyn (a joint venture between ProSiebenSat.1 Media and Discovery, Inc.). Such actions are motivated by reports showing younger generations shunning terrestrial TV, and with fears that PSBs  have no choice but to adapt in the rapidly changing television market.

Establishment of joint venture 
Following increased competition from the streaming giants on the public service broadcasters, the BBC (through BBC Worldwide) and ITV announced plans to create a Netflix-style TV service. Talks between the BBC and ITV to launch this streaming service took place in March 2016, with NBCUniversal also initially in the talks.

BritBox's launch in the United States was officially announced in December 2016, with it launching on 7 March 2017. The BBC and ITV announced several shows they would be running on BritBox including New Blood, Tutankhamun, The Moonstone, In The Dark, Cold Feet and crime series Silent Witness on US launch.  On 14 February 2018, BritBox launched in Canada.

In February 2019, it was announced that BritBox would be launched in the UK later in the year as a rival to Netflix. Journalist Mark Lawson likened the proposed project to BBC Worldwide's previous failed platform, Project Kangaroo, which was expected to launch in 2008, and described it as "bizarre" and "hugely risky". In March 2019, Channel 4 confirmed interest in collaborating with the BBC and ITV. McMafia, Last Tango in Halifax, Les Misérables and the sitcom Gavin & Stacey were some of the programmes available on the UK version, at launch.

In July 2019, the BBC and ITV announced they had signed an agreement to launch BritBox in the UK in the last quarter of 2019.

On 20 September 2019, ITV announced they had reached a deal with ViacomCBS (now Paramount Global) for Channel 5 and Comedy Central UK content. This was followed by an announcement on 27 September that Samsung TVs, Freeview Play and YouView would be the first distribution platforms.

In October 2019, BritBox launched its "testing phase" (beta) in the United Kingdom, to which users could sign up for a free trial to have a "snapshot of what will be there at launch".

On 15 October 2019, BBC Studios global distribution president, Paul Dempsey, admitted there were more markets where the UK-skewing service could work. Alongside the launch of BritBox in Australia, taking the service into its fourth market, BBC Studios and ITV have announced that they will continue to evaluate new opportunities for the roll-out of BritBox in additional territories around the world.

One day before UK launch, on 6 November 2019, The Guardian reported that Channel 4 was to join BritBox after it signed a 3-year deal to provide 1000+ hours of content from All 4 "with a range of comedy, drama and non-scripted programmes from across the service, including new series, and for the first time to any streamer, an exclusive Film4 curated service featuring iconic British films". This means for the first time, all the UK's traditional channels have managed to successfully bring together programmes on a single streaming service. Channel 4 content would be available on BritBox from April 2020 and Film4 content from September 2020, with recently aired content being only available on BritBox 31 days after the airing of the last episode on Channel 4. Channel 4 currently has not taken an equity stake in BritBox.

In March 2020, ITV described BritBox as "on plan" following its UK launch last November. The majority-owner in the BBC-ITV streaming venture reported a "strong growth" in subscribers, but didn't report any specific numbers.

On 5 March 2020, BBC and ITV announced the launch of BritBox in Australia, the service would bring Australians "an unrivalled collection of great British TV shows, and will build on the successful launch and operation of the service in both North America (the USA and Canada) and most recently in the UK". British content from across the past decades, including classic and contemporary box sets from the UK, would be directly available to Australian viewers via a wide range of mobile and connected home devices. BritBox Australia will be run as a 50/50 joint venture partnership between ITV and BBC Studios, and ITV says, the service will draw on the experience of the teams and technology used to successfully launch BritBox in North America and the UK while also recruiting a local team to conduct Australian operations.

On 27 July 2020, BritBox announced plans to expand the service to 25 more countries across Europe, Asia, the Middle East, South America and Africa. It was not specified which countries BritBox is targeting or what timeframe the rollout is expected to be completed. Following the announcement, ITV CEO Carolyn McCall said: “This international expansion plan will firmly establish BritBox as a global premium brand in a rapidly growing sector” and BBC Studios CEO Tim Davie added: “BritBox has very quickly found a place in viewers’ hearts and we know there is further appetite amongst international audiences who love great British content.”

On 21 August 2020, ITV and BBC Studios announced they're set to invest more than A$35 million (€21.2m) into BritBox Australia, which is scheduled to launch in late 2020. BBC Studios and ITV will both invest A$17.7m ($12.7m) into the new SVoD platform over the next three years. ITV has since confirmed to the London Stock Exchange that BritBox Australia is on track to launch on time despite the COVID-19 pandemic, following the confirmation of investment from the UK broadcaster's subsidiary "ITV SVOD Australia Pty Ltd" into the BritBox Australia Partnership (branded as "BritBox Australia") over a period of three years.

In late September 2020, ITV group director, SVOD, Reemah Sakaan addressed the plans to ramp up the service's international presence, she said that BritBox would primarily target markets that consume large amounts of English-language entertainment including large ones such as India, as well as "passion"-driven markets such as the Nordic countries. She said that the Joint venture would look at different structures depending on the specific opportunity, with some potentially taking a B2B2C (Business-to-Business-to-Consumer) form rather than a direct D2C (Direct to Consumer) approach, i.e. BritBox partnering with a local distributor or service provider. She added that BritBox is "focused on moving as fast as we can" into international markets.

The service launched in Australia on 23 November 2020, which ITV states is recognised globally as "Doctor Who Day".

On 16 February 2021, BBC Studios and ITV announced that BritBox is to launch in South Africa in the second half of 2021. Like most services outside the United Kingdom, the South African service will be a 50/50 joint venture between BBC Studios and ITV.

On 8 March 2021, it was announced that BritBox UK would join Amazon Video Channels in spring 2021 for UK Amazon Prime subscribers, and on 9 March it was announced that the UK service had surpassed 500,000 subscribers.

The launch date for the South African platform was announced on 27 July 2021, and it launched on 6 August 2021.

On 14 December 2021, BritBox International announced a distribution partnership with C More (TV 2 would be the distributor in Norway), bringing the service to C More and TV 2 Play subscribers in the Nordic countries of Sweden, Finland, Denmark, and Norway from early 2022. Standalone sign up to BritBox directly is available through BritBox's website in these countries. The service launched on 28 April 2022.

Growth and profitability 
On 5 December 2019, ITV's subscription video on demand Group Director Reemah Sakaan said in an interview that the service in North America had reached profitability; this was followed in 2020 by the news that the service there had surpassed 1 million users. A study commissioned by the UK media regulator Ofcom previously predicted that BritBox could have 2 million UK subscribers by the year 2023, alongside newly launched US-based SVODs Disney+ and Apple TV+. Following the COVID-19 pandemic and frequent national and local lockdowns, in August it was reported BritBox had surpassed 1.2 million subscribers in North America. BBC Studios said the streaming service "went from strength to strength, reaching 1.2 million subscribers in North America after year-end to become the fastest-growing targeted SVOD service."

On 6 October 2020, it was announced that Soumya Sriraman would depart as BritBox US and Canada's president, following the announcement that BritBox had reached 1.5 million subscribers in the US and Canada. The North American service was reported to exceeded all company targets and, according to Parks Associates OTT tracker, remains the fastest-growing targeted standalone SVOD service to have launched within the last three years. On 23 October, it was announced Emily Powers would lead the North American service when Soumya Sriraman departs at the end of October.

On 24 February 2021, Reemah Sakaan was announced to become the international CEO of BritBox. Her term at BritBox International will start in April 2021 and she would be tasked with expanding BritBox's operations outside the United Kingdom. She will oversee a team of around 100 content, customer management and business executives, including, Emily Powers, the EVP and head of BritBox North America, and Moira Hogan, country manager for BritBox Australia.

In July 2021, Diederick Santer was appointed international chief creative officer of BritBox.

BritBox UK and ITVX 
In March 2022, ITV announced that its new ITVX streaming platform - an integrated advertising and subscription funded platform for the UK market which will take over from catch-up service ITV Hub - would also include access to BritBox for British consumers. Due to this announcement the BBC has decided to sell their share in BritBox UK to ITV but still will remain a content provider to the service.

Ownership and areas served 

The BritBox service is operated by different entities depending on country of operation. Prior to 2022, the BBC was directly involved in the ownership of the UK service. BritBox outside the UK are operated by BBC Studios, the BBC's commercial subsidiary, due to restrictions on (TV Licence) funding between domestic and international services.

The service in the United States and Canada is owned by BritBox LLC, a joint venture of BBC Studios and ITV, both owning a 50% equal majority share each. AMC Networks, the BBC's joint partner on the US cable channel BBC America, is an investor and has a non-voting minority stake in the service. Concerns have risen since they purchased RLJ Entertainment (who owns a rival British TV service Acorn TV) and their own AMC+, Shudder, Allblk and HIDIVE SVOD services, as well as its stake in Philo MVPD service.

The service in the United Kingdom is wholly-owned by ITV. The service was originally a joint venture of the BBC and ITV. Channel Four Television Corporation and Paramount Networks UK & Australia on behalf of Channel 5, offered content for the service in the UK but took no shares in the joint venture operator. In March 2022, ITV announced that it had bought out the remaining stakes of the service it did not already own, and that it planned to integrate the service into an upcoming video on demand platform known as ITVX.

The service in Australia is operated by the BritBox Australia Partnership, equally owned (50%) by both BBC Studios and ITV. It launched on 23 November 2020.

The service in South Africa is equally owned by BBC Studios and ITV at 50% shares each.

The services in the Nordic countries would be distributed by TV 2 in Norway, and C More in Denmark, Sweden and Finland. Signups to BritBox International directly are available through its website.

Content

Original programmes  
In September 2017, BritBox released a reconstruction of the Doctor Who story The Wheel in Space using the surviving episodes and reconstruction using Tele-snaps. In July 2018, The Bletchley Circle: San Francisco made its debut, the first original drama series in which BritBox held a direct production role.

More original content is set to be commissioned and produced for 2020, following the platform's UK launch, with the BBC stating "The first new show is expected to be commissioned soon and will be available to BritBox viewers from 2020". The goal is to offer exclusive content only available on BritBox, rather than BBC and ITV's UK VOD services BBC iPlayer and ITV Hub. The annual budget for original programmes will be in the tens of millions of pounds according to BBC News.

ITV has pledged to invest up to £65m in the joint venture over the next two years to 2021, and the BBC has said their pledge would be in the "tens of millions".

It was confirmed in March 2020 that the first original commission to be shown on BritBox UK would be a revival of the satirical puppet show Spitting Image. The series, featuring 100 new puppets, debuted on 3 October 2020.

In the table below, "exclusive" refers to a programme where it is only available on, whilst "debut" refers to the platform a programme is first available on.

Drama

Comedy

Factual

Film and television deals 
In addition to containing the catalogues of BBC and ITV television, BritBox UK includes content from Channel 4 (including Film4), and Paramount Global through the UK channels Channel 5 and Comedy Central.

Other potential networks to offer content or ownership of BritBox include: NBCUniversal (owned by Comcast) and BT. Such collaboration would greatly increase BritBox's catalogue and financial resources when competing with other streaming platforms like Netflix, Disney+ and Amazon Prime Video. BT and NBCUniversal were reportedly in early talks with BritBox, but the progress of the talks have yet to be stated, with NBCUniversal investing in their streaming service, Peacock in the US from 2020 and its parent Comcast owning Sky's UK streaming service Now TV, making full collaboration with NBCUniversal unlikely. BT has since signed a partnership with BritBox in which the service will complement its content.

In the early days of BritBox, Channel 4 was reportedly in talks with BritBox for a long period, ITV chief executive Carolyn McCall confirmed to Radio Times that talks are "continuing" with Channel 4 and said that they will "welcome Channel 4 to BritBox". On 6 November, The Guardian reported that Channel 4 is to join BritBox, with its content available on the service from April 2020.

However, Channel 4, a publisher-broadcaster, must commission UK content from independent production companies and currently works with around 300 companies across the UK every year. As such, Channel 4 potentially lacks the streaming rights to many of the shows it broadcasts. Many independent broadcasters potentially waive these rights to strike other deals with larger SVODs (for outside UK rights) while retaining control over their intellectual property. This would therefore potentially cause the UK platform to have differing content from the international platforms.

Content co-produced between British broadcasters and larger SVODs like Netflix and Prime Video are not likely to be available on all or most BritBox platforms. This includes shows like the ITV Studios produced, BBC series Bodyguard, which a BritBox spokesperson said "Can't come back home", adding that "going forward, [BritBox] won't licence things to Netflix and Amazon in the first place because we now have a home, a streaming service in the UK".

With programming rights becoming an important issue for BritBox, the BBC and ITV have worked to keep programming rights by making deals, purchasing production companies (as with ITV Studios) or producing content for each other.

In September 2020, BritBox UK's managing director, Will Harrison said in terms of distribution, BritBox UK's availability had expanded to some 21 million devices – equating to some 13 million homes in the UK – meaning that BritBox didn't need a pay-TV distribution partner, although Harrison admitted that BritBox would like to continue those relationships, given the benefits of integration and marketing with their partners, "We continue to have those conversations.", meaning BritBox's focus is primarily on developing direct relationships and device rollouts rather than developing relationships with platforms. He advised that in early October 2020, BT was launching an offer for its broadband customers to get six months BritBox for free on its YouView box. "That's eight million BT broadband homes."

Harrison also added that the expansion of catch-up windows for iPlayer and ITV Hub meant that BritBox was also looking at non-exclusive content. Although he clarified that two-thirds of content on BritBox should remain fully exclusive "so we can live with a bit of overlap". He said that BritBox could also act as a source of complete box sets alongside the catch-up services.

* after airing, not all content is expected to be on BritBox during the stated time frame.

Criticism

Excluded and controversial content 
This may not apply to all platforms.

A big part of the BritBox catalogue is the extensive archives of the public service broadcasters, BritBox faces the challenge of hosting content that contains outdated stereotypes and opinions. In response to this, BritBox has announced that it would not include classic homegrown series that are deemed to be inappropriate for modern audiences.

BritBox bosses have said a range of older shows, such as the BBC's Till Death Us Do Part and It Ain't Half Hot Mum, as well as ITV's Love Thy Neighbour, will not appear on the service because of content deemed racist or otherwise unacceptable. Reemah Sakaan, the senior ITV executive responsible for launching the subscription video-on-demand service, said "We also recomply everything that goes on to BritBox [with modern TV viewing standards]. There's also the ability to create bespoke warnings around key programming."

Sakaan confirmed that Till Death Us Do Part, first aired on BBC1 in 1965, which features the bigoted character Alf Garnett, and ITV's 1970s series Love Thy Neighbour, a sitcom about a West Indian couple who move next door to a White British couple, will not appear on the service. Some individual episodes of the BBC's Only Fools and Horses and a Doctor Who serial from the original run (The Talons of Weng-Chiang, 1977) are also deemed problematic. In the Doctor Who serial, people of Chinese extraction are termed "inscrutable Chinks" and an English actor performs in "yellowface". Some Fawlty Towers episodes will run with warnings of offensive language. The Doctor Who serial from 1977 has a warning attached indicating "Contains stereotypes that some may find offensive."

In June 2020, following the widespread George Floyd protests, shows like Little Britain were removed from BritBox, along with others, due to the use of blackface in the programme.

Non-exclusive deals 
The sale of rights to BBC and Channel 5 content has caused some reporters to be wary of BritBox's viability as a platform for new content, due to deals with larger SVODs to exclusively stream newer BBC content and non-exclusive deals with Sky and Now TV to access Channel 5 box sets. However, many BBC Studios' deals have given licences to some of its content to many other SVODs on a non-exclusive basis. With newer or co-produced series more likely to be exclusive to certain SVODs, shown with the new 2020 original commissions being BritBox UK exclusive. Whereas Sky already has existing deals with not only Channel 5, but Channel 4 and the BBC to have certain box sets on their Sky and Now TV platforms in the UK.

All current and future series of the 2005 revival of Doctor Who will be exclusive to stream on HBO Max in the US, following a deal between the two, on 1 August 2019. Other content from BBC Studios such as The Honourable Woman, Luther, Top Gear, and the British version of The Office would be available on HBO Max on a non-exclusive basis, meaning they would potentially be also available on BritBox.

On 1 April 2019, a 10-year content partnership was agreed between BBC Studios and Discovery, which will see Discovery become the exclusive global home of the BBC's landmark natural history programmes including the Planet Earth, Blue Planet and Life franchises for SVOD. The Dynasties series, hosted by Sir David Attenborough, is included in the deal, as are future BBC-commissioned landmark series. This deal applies Worldwide except the UK, Ireland and Greater China, meaning such series may be unavailable on BritBox platforms outside the United Kingdom. Upcoming co-produced content between Discovery and BBC Studios would be exclusive to Discovery's upcoming streaming platform outside the UK.

The Discovery deal includes around 500 hours of non-exclusive content, which will still be available on other streaming services. A BBC Studios spokesperson told TBI that the relationship with Discovery is "very significant and important but it is not 100% exclusive on all titles in all regions and is, therefore, able to co-exist alongside regional deals of this type", following BBC Studios' deal to provide factual content to Greek telco OTE's pay-TV service Cosmote TV.

Limitations 
With limitations to its budget and original programming when compared to other SVODs, BritBox faces strong competition in the increasingly crowded streaming market. Critics warn that BritBox needs to greatly increase its financial firepower and original programming to compete in especially the UK market, against rivals, Netflix, Prime Video and Disney+, following reports more Brits would subscribe to Disney+ over BritBox. Critics say that BritBox is no rival, and cannot rival Netflix without substantial resources. BritBox also faces direct competition with Acorn TV, an American streaming service that provides many British television programmes, among others, with the service recently launching in the UK.

Platforms 
The list of available programmes differs between the Australian, Canadian, South African, UK and US platforms.  For example, BritBox carries Coronation Street in the US but not in Canada, where the corresponding rights have long been held by CBC Television. Meanwhile, in the UK, TV shows, especially produced by independent production companies (like the BBC show Peaky Blinders) may appear on the UK BritBox, as the BBC or ITV have the domestic broadcasting rights, but may not be available on BritBox elsewhere, due to the independent production companies giving international rights to services like Netflix. This means that depending on whether the BBC and ITV own only domestic rights, programmes on UK BritBox may not also be available on its international platforms outside of the UK. Alternatively, shows like Living the Dream may not appear on the UK BritBox, as it is broadcast by Sky and available on Sky's streaming service Now TV in the UK, but currently appears on the US BritBox.

BBC and ITV content currently on other streaming services are likely to be exclusive to BritBox once the other SVOD licences expire, therefore potentially leading to harmony in programming between the platforms. Any original content produced for all BritBox platforms is set to be exclusively on BritBox, however, some UK commissioned content may be UK exclusive.

Whether content co-produced between British broadcasters and larger SVODs, like Netflix and Prime Video, will be on any BritBox platforms is unclear, these include shows like Bodyguard in which a BritBox Spokesperson said "can't come back home", and who added that "going forward, we [BritBox] won't licence things to Netflix and Amazon in the first place because we now have a home, a streaming service in the UK", they also added that in response to not licensing to other SVODs, since its focus is on UK-produced series, the platform would not compete to acquire the rights to US or international shows.

Recently aired or current shows made for the BBC, ITV, Channel 4 and Channel 5 terrestrially in the United Kingdom, would appear on their VOD services, BBC iPlayer, ITV Hub, My5 and All 4 respectively before BritBox. These shows would then move to BritBox at a later date, then be exclusive to BritBox once the shows have expired on the terrestrial VOD, which is 30 days for ITV Hub and My5, 31 days for All 4 and 12 months for BBC iPlayer.

New content not made exclusively for BritBox, but for the BBC for example, may not be available on BritBox platforms outside the UK, due to deals struck with other SVODs such as HBO Max and Discovery.

United States 
BritBox's launch in the United States was announced in December 2016, it launched on 7 March 2017.

Among the shows offered upon BritBox's initial launch, were the US premieres of New Blood and Tutankhamun. In addition, other episodes of new programmes available on the service include:

On 1 August 2019, HBO Max announced its acquisition of library rights to several BBC Studios series, including the first 11 seasons of the 2005 Doctor Who revival, as well as future seasons 12–14. The Honourable Woman, Luther, Top Gear, and the original British series The Office are also some other shows in the acquisition. HBO Max will also stream future seasons of Doctor Who after their initial run on BBC America. Newer Doctor Who would be exclusive to HBO Max, with the other shows in the deal sold on a non-exclusive basis.

Canada 
BritBox launched in Canada on 14 February 2018, on launch the service included a free 7-day trial and in which content can be streamed on the web, on an iOS app, Apple TV, Android, Samsung TVs, Chromecast and Roku. It comes with a free 7-day introductory trial and priced at CAD 8.99 per month on launch. Users who signed up for the service in the U.S. will be able to access their subscription in Canada.

The catalogue of content on the Canadian platform is similar to the American platform, but minor differences do exist, for example, Coronation Street isn't on Canadian BritBox, due to CBC Television holding the Canadian broadcasting rights.

United Kingdom 
BritBox launched in the UK on 7 November 2019. Unlike other platforms, the UK platform would include content from the BBC, ITV, Channel 4 (which includes Film4 Productions), Channel 5 and Comedy Central UK.

BritBox UK signed a partnership deal with Channel 4 in 2019, allowing the service to host over a thousand hours of content from All 4 over the next three years. New series will continue to appear on BritBox one month after transmission of the last episode on Channel 4's channels.

An exclusive Film4 curated service featuring iconic British films was announced to follow the launch of Channel 4 content on BritBox later in 2020. On 21 August, BritBox UK confirmed a collection of 25 titles, primarily drawn from the Film4 library, including: Trainspotting, Beast, Charlotte Gray and The Hatton Garden Job which were made available on the service from 17 September 2020. A further 25 titles were added before the end of 2020.

In 2022, ITV became the sole owner of the service in the UK, following its purchase of the BBC's 10% stake in the company.

Other countries

Australia 
On 5 March 2020, the BBC and ITV announced that BritBox is to launch in Australia in late 2020. The service finally launched in Australia on 23 November 2020.

South Africa 
On 27 July 2021, BBC and ITV set 6 August 2021 as the launch date for the platform, with the service priced at R99.99 per month, R999.90 per year, and a 7-day free trial. It launched on 6 August 2021.

Nordic countries 
On 14 December 2021, BritBox International announced a distribution partnership with C More (TV 2 would be the distributor in Norway), bringing the service to C More and TV2 subscribers in the Nordic countries of Sweden, Finland, Denmark, and Norway from early 2022. Users in these countries can signup directly to BritBox through its website. The service launched on 28 April 2022 in the four countries. In Denmark, the service is included in all C More subscription packages. In Finland, the service is available to subscribers to C More, C More Hockey and C More Total+. In Sweden, the service is available to subscribers of C More Standard or of a higher package.

Technical requirements 

BritBox is only available to residents of Australia, Canada, Denmark, Finland, Norway, South Africa, Sweden, the United Kingdom and the United States.  Canadian and US residents can use BritBox in only each other's countries (with differences in show availability due to rights restrictions). Users in the four Nordic countries can use the service throughout the European Union. The UK, Australian and South African service can only be accessed in that country.

Operating systems

Web browsers

Compatible devices 
''Devices with native applications

Notes

References

External links 
  – official site
  – official site

BBC
ITV (TV network)
Subscription video on demand services
2017 establishments in the United States
Internet properties established in 2017
Joint ventures
Digital television in the United Kingdom